Andrea Grebenar (born 7 November 1997) is a Bosnia and Herzegovina footballer who plays as a defender for Croatian Women's First Football League club Split and the Bosnia and Herzegovina women's national team.

References

1997 births
Living people
Women's association football defenders
Bosnia and Herzegovina women's footballers
Bosnia and Herzegovina expatriate women's footballers
Bosnia and Herzegovina women's international footballers